Tan Sri Gunn Chit Tuan (21 May 1929 - 18 May 2013) was a Chief Justice of the High Court of Malaya, serving on the Supreme Court of Malaysia, High Court of Malaysia as well as in the Judicial and Legal Service as Senior Federal Counsel, Assistant Parliamentary Draftsman and President of the Sessions Court and Assistant District Officer in the Malayan Civil Service. He presided over the landmark case Commonwealth of Australia v Midforth (Malaysia) Sdn Bhd, which recognized that common law would still be applicalble after the statutory cutoff date of 7 April, 1956. He retired from the court in 1994.

Life 
Tan Sri Gunn Chit Tuan born in Kuala Lumpur on 21 May, 1929.

He received his early education at Batu Road School and Victoria Institution before the Japanese occupation in 1941. He went on to read law at Peterhouse College, Cambridge University. Contemporary classmates include Lee Kuan Yew, Kwa Geok Choo (later Mrs Lee Kuan Yew), Yong Pung How, Eddie Barker, and Raja Tun Mohar Raja Badiozaman.
He was called to the English Bar by the Honourable Society of Lincoln's Inn in November 1952. He was admitted to the Malayan Bar in November 1953 and joined the firm SM Yong & Co.

Career 
He joined the Malayan Civil Service as an Assistant District Officer, and in 1958 joined the Judicial and Legal Service. There he served as President of the Sessions Court, Assistant Parliamentary Draftsman, and Senior Federal Counsel.

On 15 Jan 1977 he was elevated to the Malayan High Court, the third highest court, the first being the Federal Court, and then the Court of Appeal.

In 1987 he was appointed to the Federal Court, now called the Supreme Court. In 1992 he became Chief Justice of the High Court of Malaya.

Significant cases 
Commonwealth of Australia v Midforth (Malaysia) Sdn Bhd

Honours
 :
 Companion of the Order of Loyalty to the Crown of Malaysia (J.S.M.) (1973)
 Commander of the Order of Loyalty to the Crown of Malaysia (P.S.M.) - Tan Sri (1991)
 Commander of the Order of the Defender of the Realm (P.M.N.) - Tan Sri (1994)

References

1929 births
2013 deaths
Companions of the Order of Loyalty to the Crown of Malaysia
Commanders of the Order of Loyalty to the Crown of Malaysia
Commanders of the Order of the Defender of the Realm
Chief justices of Malaysia
People from Kuala Lumpur
Alumni of Peterhouse, Cambridge